Territorial Council elections were held in Saint Pierre and Miquelon, a self-governing territorial overseas collectivity of France, on 20 March 2022. All 19 seats on the Territorial Council were up for election.

Results

References

Elections in Saint Pierre and Miquelon
Saint Pierre
Saint Pierre
Saint Pierre